The Klawasi group is a cluster of three large mud volcanoes on the western flank of Mount Drum, a Pleistocene stratovolcano in the Wrangell Mountains of east-central Alaska in the United States. The cluster includes the Upper Klawasi, the Lower Klawasi and the Shrub.

The volcanoes eject mostly warm mud, water, and CO2; the carbon dioxide is known to affect the flora and fauna of the area.

References

External links
 Volcano information — Alaska Volcano Observatory page
 Thermal imagery research — Research page at the University of Hawaii

Mud volcanoes
Volcanology
Wrangell–St. Elias National Park and Preserve